Anurag Anand (born 2 November 1978) is an Indian artist, corporate professional, and author with several bestselling titles in the self-help, general fiction and historical fiction genres. His corporate experience pans across industries like pharmaceuticals, fast-moving consumer goods and financial services.

Education 
After obtaining his primary education from Kurseong in Darjeeling District, Anand moved to Delhi. He completed his schooling from Delhi Public School, Mathura Road, New Delhi in 1996. Thereafter he did is B. A. (Hons) in Economics from Delhi University before pursuing his PGDBM (Post Graduate Diploma in Management) from Lal Bahadur Shastri Institute of Management, Delhi (2000 -2002).

Career 
Anand's writing career began with the book Pillars of Success (2004), a self-help book that owes its genesis to Anand's association during his college days with the Delhi based NGO, UNES. As a part of the Youth Development Program of UNES, Anand delivered lectures on aspects of personality development to school students across the country and it is the learnings from these interactions that he summarised in his first book. Since then Anand has also written general fiction and historical fiction novels. Anurag's articles and columns have been published in several major publications, one of the most significant ones being his monthly column, Corporate Whispers, published in Suburb Live magazine.

Anurag has penned a song, titled Bhaga which is the theme song for his book – To Hell and Back (2018). The song has been composed and sung by the popular music director Ram Sampath. This is probably one of the first instances when a theme song has been released as a part of a book's promotion.

As an artist, Anurag is inspired by what FN Souza once said: "my paintings should disturb the calm, the smug". In addition to the unique combination of colours, his paintings are unique in their rough, sometimes almost gothic treatment of delicate and pious subjects.

Awards 

In 2016 Anurag was conferred with the Lal Bahadur Shastri Award for Corporate Excellence to commemorate his contributions to the society and the spirit of entrepreneurship through his achievements in the corporate world. The award was presented by Air Chief Marshal S.K Sareen, former Indian Air Force Chief and Anil Shastri former Union Minister. 

In February 2019 Anurag Anand was felicitated among the Top HR 40under40 leaders in the country at the Leading From Behind Summit. He was also recognized among the Role Players – 2019 by the World Training and Development Congress.

Bibliography 
Non-Fiction
Pillars of Success (2004)
Corporate Mantras (2007)
Fiction
 Tic Toc – A tale of love, hate and terror (2009); 
The book is a manifestation of a common man's hatred for terrorism. The book was launched in Mumbai by acclaimed filmmaker Mahesh Bhatt.
 The Quest for Nothing (2010); 
A contemporary story of a young and ambitious couple and the conflict between their personal aspirations and career goals, The Quest for Nothing was declared a National Bestseller within six months of its release. The book was launched by a panel comprising Pritish Nandy, Gul Panag and Mini Mathur,.
 Reality Bites (2011); 
Reality Bites is a youthful love story set in a high school hostel. The book was launched at Landmark, Mumbai by Bollywood personalities including Sudhir Mishra, Randeep Hooda and Kanishtha Dhankhar (Femina Miss India World 2011).
 The Legend of Amrapali (2012); 
This is a work of historical fiction giving a life account of the courtesan Amrapali who lived in the kingdom of Vaishali around 500 BC. The book was launched in Mumbai, New Delhi, Kolkata and Ahmedabad by panellists comprising Prahlad Kakkar, Bhagyashree, Mallika Sarabhai, Shashi Tharoor, Sonalika Sahay, Indrani Dasgupta and Alokananda Roy.
 Of Tattoos and Taboos!(2009); 
Of Tattoos and Taboos is a contemporary story that traces the transition of an innocent, small-town girl into a modern, fiercely independent, big-city belle.
 Where The Rainbow (2013); 
Veiled beneath a captivating story, Where the Rainbow Ends aims to spread awareness about cervical cancer – the second largest cause of cancer related deaths among women across the globe and a looming threat that can be averted by timely vaccination – among its readers.
 Birth of The Bastard Prince  (2014); 
In Birth of the Bastard Prince, the sequel to the riveting The Legend of Amrapali, Anurag Anand explores Amrapali's eventful life as the Nagarvadhu. He describes in thrilling detail the war between Vaishali and Magadh, in which Amrapali played a crucial role; traces her love affair with Bimbisara, the Emperor of Magadh, and the birth of their son Vimal Kondanna; reveals the royal intrigue and conspiracies that led to Amrapali's tribulations; and finally explains how Amrapalu found the solace and happiness she so desired. 
 Love on 3 Wheels (2015);  Love on 3 Wheels is a romantic thriller that plays out on the streets of Delhi over a three-day period.
 To Hell and Back (2018);  To Hell and Back is a fast-paced thriller that will not only keep you on tenterhooks till the very end, but it shall also rattle your beliefs on how ‘crime-proof’ the world that you live in truly is.
 The Assassination of Rajat Gandy (2018);  The Assassination of Rajat Gandy is a gripping political thriller that can alter your views on politics and the political establishment.
 Once Upon a Lockdown'' (2020);  Once upon a lockdown is a collection of gripping stories from the Covid-19 induced lockdown in India.

Media 
Anand's works have been extensively covered in all forms of media including most national dailies and magazines. He has been invited to various television news channels like CNN IBN and UTV Bloomberg to participate in panel discussions and debates. He has also been invited by FM Radio channels like Radio Mirchi, Radio City and Red FM for on-air discussions.

Family 
Anurag Anand lives in Gurugram with his wife Neeru and daughter Naisha. Anurag met Neeru while pursuing his higher studies in Delhi. Neeru Anand works with a Multinational Pharmaceutical company.

See also
 List of Indian writers

References

External links 
 Official Website
 Official Youtube Channel

1978 births
English-language writers from India
Indian male novelists
Living people
Delhi University alumni
21st-century Indian novelists
Delhi Public School alumni
Writers from Patna
Novelists from Bihar
21st-century Indian male writers
Indian male painters
People from Bihar
21st-century Indian painters
21st-century Indian male artists